Hell Roaring Creek is a fast-running creek in southern Montana. The creek flows from Brower's Spring, which is considered the ultimate source of the Missouri River. Hell Roaring Creek is the most distant point in the Mississippi River system and, combined with its downstream rivers, marks the starting point of the fourth longest river in the world.

References

Rivers of Montana
Missouri River
Tributaries of the Missouri River
Tributaries of the Beaverhead River